The Victoria Botanical Gardens (also called Mont Fleuri Botanical Gardens Seychelles) in Seychelles was established in 1901 by Mr. Paul Evenor Rivalz Dupont (Director of Agricultural Services and Naturalist of Seychelles). Today the Ministry of Environment is responsible for the Botanical Gardens and has its headquarters in it. The main objective of the gardens is to contribute towards the national efforts in environmental education, plant conservation, landscape management, passive recreation and eco-tourism.

External links 
  section of Seychelles Ministry of Environment.
 The Botanical Garden of Victoria an article and photos.

Victoria, Seychelles